George Saunders (1 March 1918 – 1982) was an English footballer who played in the Football League for Everton.

External links
 

English footballers
English Football League players
Everton F.C. players
1918 births
1982 deaths
Association football fullbacks
Sportspeople from Birkenhead
Date of death missing